MasterChef South Africa is the South African version of the television cooking game show franchise MasterChef. It was originally filmed on the Nederburg Wine Estate in Paarl, Western Cape and judged by Pete Goffe-Wood, Benny Masekwameng, Reuben Riffel and Andrew Atkinson, up to the third season. The series' first run was from March 2012 – May 2015.

On 17 August 2021, M-Net announced that the show would be back for a fourth season in 2022, which kicked off on 28 February 2022. Filming was done at the V&A Waterfront in Cape Town, Western Cape with a new production company and new judges.

Format

Preliminaries

Of all the amateur chefs who audition nationwide, one hundred are chosen to cook their signature dish for the three judges. Each judge takes a taste of the dish and gives his opinion before voting a "yes" or a "no". At least two "yes" votes are required to earn a white MasterChef apron, allowing the competitor to advance.

Mystery Box challenge

In the Mystery Box challenge, contestants receive a number of ingredients of which they are to make a dish of their choice. The contestants have to use all the ingredients in the box. Once the dishes are finished, the judges taste all the dishes. The winner receives an advantage in the following elimination challenge.

Off-site team challenge

The off-site team challenge involves the contestants being split into two teams, blue and red, which consist of equal numbers and are given a task, for example, running a restaurant or catering for a party or wedding (similar to Gordon Ramsay's other series, Hell's Kitchen). After the task has been completed, the teams are given the results, which can be determined by third party votes. Members of the losing team compete in an elimination challenge.

Pressure test

A "pressure test" challenge involves competitors who failed in a previous challenge (i.e. the three worst performers in an individual challenge or the losing team in a group challenge). The competitors are given a dish that they then must create in a particular time frame. Once the contestants have finished cooking, the dishes are taken to the judges to be tasted, who then criticize, vote and eliminate one or more contestants.

Seasons

Season 1 (2012)

The first season aired in March 2012, ending with Deena Naidoo as the winner and Sue-Ann Allen as runner-up.

Season 2 (2013)

The second season aired in June 2013, ending with Kamini Pather as the winner and Leandri van der Wat as runner-up, while her sister Seline came third.

Season 3 (2014)

The third season of MasterChef South Africa aired its first episode on 21 August 2014. Abigail Mbalo-Mokoena was among the competitors.

Celebrity (2015)

Celebrity MasterChef South Africa aired its first episode on 8 February 2015.

Season 4 (2022) 

The fourth season of MasterChef South Africa was announced on 17 August 2021 and began airing on M-Net on 28 February 2022 with 20 contestants. Shawn Godrey took the winner title leaving Andriëtte de le Harpe as the runner-up.

References 

South Africa
2012 South African television series debuts
2010s South African television series
South African reality television series
South African television series based on British television series